The American Idols Live! Tour 2002 was a fall concert tour featuring the top ten contestants of the inaugural season of American Idol, which aired earlier that year. The tour visited 30 cities across the United States starting October 8, 2002 in San Diego, and became the template for concerts tours following each of the succeeding American Idol seasons. Select performances of Clarkson are also released in the Miss Independent DVD album in 2003.

Performers

Show overview
The show, as well as those from all subsequent tours, was organized into two halves.  The first half had the Top 10 contestants performing a song each in elimination order, with Kelly Clarkson the winner ending this section.   Each performer was introduced by the preceding performer accompanied by a video montage of their time on American Idol, the exception being the first performer EJay Day who was introduced by Randy Jackson on video.  Most of the solo performances were of songs the performer had previously done on the television show.

After the intermission, the second half started with the guys and the girls each performing a group song, with the rest of the show consisted of a series of group numbers with medley of songs interspersed with some solo performances, similar in style to the television special "American Idol in Las Vegas" aired after Season 1 finale.  The runner-up Justin Guarini and the winner Kelly Clarkson each had their final solo performance before the last group songs by the Top 10 finalists which ended the show.

Set list
 EJay Day – "Black Cat" (Janet Jackson)
 Jim Verraros – "Easy" (Commodores)
 AJ Gil – "My Cherie Amour"  (Stevie Wonder)
 Ryan Starr – "If You Really Love Me"  (Stevie Wonder)
 Christina Christian – "Ain't No Sunshine"  (Bill Withers)
 R. J. Helton – "Lately" (Stevie Wonder)
 Tamyra Gray – "I'm Every Woman" (Chaka Khan)
 Nikki McKibbin – "Piece of My Heart" (Janis Joplin)
 Justin Guarini – "Get Here"  (Oleta Adams)
 Kelly Clarkson – "Respect" (Aretha Franklin)

Intermission
 Guys – "Pop" ('N Sync)
 Girls – "Free Your Mind" (En Vogue)
 Guarini –  "For Once in My Life" (Stevie Wonder)
 Clarkson – "(You Make Me Feel Like) A Natural Woman" (Aretha Franklin)
 Group – Soul Medley – "Dancing in the Street" (Group), "Get Ready" (Guys), "I Can't Help Myself (Sugar Pie Honey Bunch)" (Helton), "Reach Out I'll Be There" (Group), "You Are the Sunshine of My Life" (Verraros), "You're All I Need" (Clarkson), "My Guy" (Girls), "My Girl" (Guys), "Ain't No Mountain High Enough" (Group)
 McKibbin – "Rhiannon" (Fleetwood Mac)
 Gray – "A House Is Not a Home" (Dionne Warwick)
 Group Medley – "Celebration" (Group), "Ain't No Stoppin' Us Now" (Group), "We Are Family" (Girls), "Love Machine" (Guys), "Fantasy" (Group), "Boogie Wonderland" (Group)
 Guarini – "Let's Stay Together" (Al Green)
 Clarkson – "A Moment Like This" (Kelly Clarkson)
 Group – "That's What Friends Are For" (Dionne Warwick and Friends), "I'll Be There" (The Jackson 5)

Additional notes
 Kelly Clarkson performed her single "Before Your Love" instead of "A Moment Like This" on some shows.

Tour dates

Response
The response to the tour was well-received, with some dates sold out and most generally did well. A total of 258,526 tickets were sold with a revenue of $8,119,342 as reported by Billboard.

Tour summary
Number of shows – 30 (5 sold out)
Total gross – $8,119,342
Total attendance – 258,526
Average attendance – 8,618 (82%)
Average ticket price – $31.41

References

American Idol concert tours
Kelly Clarkson concert tours
2002 concert tours